"Rajaton Rakkaus" (Borderless Love in Finnish) is perhaps one of the most known songs released by Timo Rautiainen & Trio Niskalaukaus. It was released on the album Itku Pitkästä Ilosta and as a single. The song tells about an unspecified man who lives in Finland and has married a woman in Estonia. The woman refuses to move to Finland with his husband and the man doesn't like Estonia. The man realizes he will never meet his wife and hangs himself near the end of the song ("The roof is too low and the rope is too thick")

Track listing
 "Rajaton Rakkaus"
 "Viimeinen Päivä Taivaan?" (Finnish cover of Barathrum's "Last Day in Heaven")

2000 singles
2000 songs